Melvin Raffin (born 9 August 1998 in Bourg-la-Reine) is a French athlete specialising in the triple jump.

Career
Raffin represented his country at the 2017 World Championships without qualifying for the final. Additionally, he won bronze medals at the 2016 World U20 Championships and 2017 European U20 Championships.

His personal bests in the event are 16.85 metres outdoors (+0.6 m/s, Montgeron 2017) and 17.20 metres indoors (Belgrade 2017). He is the current world junior record holder indoors.

Personal life
Born in mainland France, Raffin is of Martiniquais descent.

International competitions

1No mark in the final

References

External links
 
 
 

1998 births
Living people
French male triple jumpers
World Athletics Championships athletes for France
People from Bourg-la-Reine
Sportspeople from Hauts-de-Seine
Athletes (track and field) at the 2020 Summer Olympics
Olympic athletes of France
French people of Martiniquais descent